Looking After Jo Jo is a 1998 BBC Scotland television drama starring Robert Carlyle.

John Joseph (Jo Jo) McCann (Carlyle) has been a habitual criminal since childhood, when he pilfered cash boxes for his dad. He's been in and out of prison ever since. He lives in a high rise council flat with his mother and sister.

Looking After JoJo traces the career of a petty thief turned drug dealer in 1980's Edinburgh. The title character is a pleasant if misguided young man surviving in a bleak housing estate and aspiring to the trappings of a successful criminal. Unfortunately for him, and for most of the other characters in the mini-series, it is a time of heroin addiction and AIDS. We watch JoJo become ensnared in the drugs scene and his deterioration is both painful to watch and very moving. Robert Carlyle's performance is extraordinarily complex and textured. He is ably supported by Jenny McCrindle, Ewan Stewart and Trainspotting's Kevin McKidd. This isn't the fast-moving MTV drug scene of Trainspotting but a more character-oriented, leisurely look at the human cost of drug addiction.

It is filmed and set in and around the North Sighthill housing estate, with several scenes also filmed in Niddrie.

Cast and characters

 Robert Carlyle as John Joe "Jo Jo" McCann; a petty thief turned drug dealer. Jo Jo is troubled by memories of his past, in particular his father's death.
 Kevin McKidd as Basil; One of Jo Jo's crew, who experiments early on with Heroin and leads the group to its sales.
 Jenny McCrindle as Lorraine; Jo Jo's love interest, and a Marilyn Monroe lookalike.

Episodes
 Episode 1: Steal the Herd

In 1982 Jo Jo McCann always manages to stay one step ahead of the police. Family loyalties are tested to the limit by his determination to set up a crime empire in opposition to his uncle, the local underworld kingpin who has a few ruthless ideas of his own. With Ewan Stewart, Jenny McCrindle, Kevin McKidd and Ellie Haddington

 Episode 2: Working Week

The attraction of making big money dealing heroin proves too much for recently acquitted Jo Jo, who jumps on the bandwagon at the first opportunity. But evil undercurrents of violence and addiction soon surface as he becomes consumed by Edinburgh's drug culture, prompting him to think carefully about his future. Hard-hitting crime drama.

 Episode 3: Sink the Belgrano

It is 1983 Money begins to roll in at long last as Jo Jo's heroin business takes off in earnest. But what he doesn't take into account, is that his dodgy dealings are about to destroy everything he loves

 Episode 4: When Love Goes Wrong

The walls of Jo Jo's world come tumbling down as he finally uncovers the truth about his father's death. Meanwhile, the community spirit of the estate collapses under the pressure of Sarah's imprisonment, Charlie McCann's murder and a rampant Aids epidemic. Last in series.

Critical reception
The Guardian wrote "Despite a cortege-paced narrative, Looking After Jo Jo has enough wit and moral backbone to take its place alongside other recent gems in Scottish drama."

DVD release
Looking After Jo Jo was released on VHS by the BBC in 1999 after its initial showing on BBC2 in 1998.  In 2015 Simply Media released it on DVD.

References

External links
 

1998 Scottish television series debuts
1998 Scottish television series endings
BBC Scotland television shows
BBC television dramas
Television shows set in Edinburgh
Films shot in Edinburgh
Films directed by John Mackenzie (film director)